United States gubernatorial elections were held in 1948, in 33 states, concurrent with the House, Senate elections and presidential election, on November 2, 1948 (September 13 in Maine).

This was the last time Connecticut elected its governors to 2-year terms, switching to 4-years from the 1950 election.

Results

See also 
1948 United States elections
1948 United States presidential election
1948 United States Senate elections
1948 United States House of Representatives elections

Notes

References 

 
November 1948 events in the United States